Swaminatha Desikar "Susai" (born 11 November 1860 ) born Swaminatha Desikar, was a spiritual writer. He was born from a Tamil-speaking Desikar family in Valavanur, Tamil Nadu. He compiled three books in Tamil.

Biography

Family background 
Swaminatha Desikar was born in a village called Valavanur near by Mailam in Tamil Nadu, South India into an orthodox Saiva Tamil (Desikar) family around the middle of the 19th century. Swaminatha Desikar's father was a respected spiritual leader. His father Sundaresanar Desikar was a philosopher and Sthapathi. The great Tamil poet Velaiyar is the grand father of Swaminatha Desikar and Siva Prakasar and  Karunai prakasar are sundaresanar's uncles. Gnambikai Ammal wife of Santhalinga Swamigal is Sundaresanar's aunt.

Siva prakasar was blessed as ‘Siva Anuputhichelvar’ by Sri Sivagnana Balaya swamigal from Mailam Pommapura Aathenam mutt. He is also acclaimed as ‘Karpanai Kalangiyam’ by Tamil scholars. He compiled " Neerotta Amaha Anthathi " to defeat an arrogant poet. Those thirty venpa verses will not make both lips touch. And also written 'Nanneri, Yesu Matha Niragaranam (The Refuting the Religion of Jesus).

He attain mukthi motcha at 32 in Nallathur near pondy.

Siva prakasar's sister Gnambikai married Perur Santhalinga Swamigal.

Karunai prakasar got married. And he wrote more than five books in Tamil. Seegalathi sarukkam, Ishtalinga Agaval.

He demised at Thiruvengai.

Swaminatha Desikar's grandfather Velaiyar married Meenatchi Ammal. He had a son named Sundaresanar. Velaiyar wrote more than seven books. Mayilathula, Nallur puranam, Mayilai thirattai mani maalai, Ishta linga kaithala maalai, Kumbakona Sarangathevar history as Veera singhathana puranam, Gugai Namachivaya Desikar history as Namchivaya leelai and Krisnanan history as Paarijatha leelai and attained mukthi motcha at Perumathur at the age of seventy two.

Sundaresanar married Karpagammal. He settled down his family in Valavanur.

Swaminatha Desikar converted himself to Christianity, changed his name as Susai alias Swaminatha desikar and married Gnasounthari.
He had two sons and one daughter named as Savarimuthu, Gnamuthu and Rakkini. Savarimuthu married Mary from Penang and got two sons named as S.V.S.Rathinam and Ponnuthambi.

Early life
Swaminatha Desikar learnt all sort of arts. He became a philosopher as well as a sculptor. As he belongs to a Saivai orthodox family, he use to do Katha Kalatchepam in temples. He always preferred to play the Yesu Matha Niragaranam themes in his Katha Kaltchepam (Divine story telling programme). But his mind changed and converted himself to Christianity.

Final years
He died near Thirukovilur at the age of 78.

Writings
He wrote more than three books and few folk dramas (Koothu).

Books
Gnasounthari Koothu Kaviyam
Yesuvin Uyirpu
Naan En Kiristhuan Aanen

References

External links

1860 births
1939 deaths
Indian Shaivite religious leaders
Converts to Christianity from Hinduism
Spiritual teachers
Tamil writers
Tamil-language writers
People from Viluppuram district
Indian Christians
19th-century Hindu religious leaders
20th-century Hindu religious leaders